A bronze replica of the Statue of Liberty was installed in Washington, D.C., in 2021.

See also
 Replicas of the Statue of Liberty

References

2021 establishments in Washington, D.C.
Bronze sculptures in the United States
Replicas of the Statue of Liberty
Statues in Washington, D.C.